Assimilation was a major ideological component of French colonialism during the 19th and 20th centuries. The French government promoted the concept of cultural assimilation to colonial subjects in the French colonial empire, claiming that by adopting French culture they would ostensibly be granted the full rights enjoyed by French citizens and be legally considered "French". Colonial settlements established by the French, such as the Four Communes in French West Africa, were created with the assimilation concept in mind, and while Africans living in such settlements were theoretically granted the full rights of French citizens, discriminatory policies from various French colonial administrations denied most of these rights to "full-blooded Africans".

Definition 
The concept of assimilation in French colonial discourse was based on the idea of spreading French culture to France's colonies in the 19th and the 20th centuries. Colonial subjects living in French colonies were considered French citizens as long as French culture and customs were adopted. That also meant that they would have the rights and duties of French citizens.

The meaning of assimilation has been greatly debated.  One possible definition stated that French laws apply to all colonies outside France regardless of the distance from France, the size of the colony, the organization of society, the economic development, race or religious beliefs. A cultural definition for assimilation can be the expansion of the French culture outside Europe.

Arthur Girault published Principes de colonisation et de Legislation coloniale in 1885, which defined assimilation as "eclectic". Its ideal, he considered "the constantly more intimate union between the colonial territory and the metropolitan territory". He also wrote that all military responsibilities of a French citizen also apply to the natives of the colonies.

Protests against assimilation 

Colonial subjects in West Africa devised a variety of strategies to resist the establishment of a colonial system and to oppose specific institutions of the system such as labourers engaged in strike action in the late 19th and the early 20th centuries in Lagos, the Cameroons, Dahomey, and Guinea.

Ideological protests included the banding together of the Lobi and the Bambara of French Sudan against the spread of French culture.  Shaykh Ahmadu Bamba founded a movement, Mouridiyya, to protest the establishment of French colonial rule, while numerous messianic or millenarian or Ethiopian churches with distinctively African liturgies and doctrines were established to resist the imposition of Western-style Christianity. 

Meanwhile, a variety of groups formed to protest specific colonialist laws or measures imposed on indigenous populations, such as the Young Senegalese Club and the Aborigines' Rights Protection Society, which used newspapers, pamphlets, and plays to protect themselves from assimilation.

Despite widespread protests, colonialism was firmly entrenched in the whole of West Africa by World War I. Until the abolishing of the colonial rule, Africa had endured many oppressions in relation to religion, tradition, customs and culture.

History 
The creation of modern France through expansion goes back to the establishment of a small kingdom in the area around Paris in the late 10th century and was not completed until the corporation of Nice and Savoy in 1860. The existing "hexagon" was the result of a long series of wars and conquests involving the triumph of the French language and the French culture over what once were autonomous and culturally distinctive communities, especially the Occitan-speaking areas of Southern France, whose language (langue d'oc), distinct from French, was banned from official use in the 16th century and from everyday use during the French Revolution. The creation of the French hexagon by conquest and annexations established an ideological precedent for the "civilising mission" that served as a rationale for French colonialism. A long experience of turning peasants and culturally-exogenous provincials into Frenchmen seemed to raise the possibility that the same could be done for the colonised peoples of Africa and Asia.

The initial stages of assimilation in France were observed during the revolution. In 1794, deputies, some of whom were from the Caribbean and from French India, passed a law was passed that declared that "all men resident in the colonies, without distinction of color, are French citizens and enjoy all the rights assured by the Constitution".

In the early 19th century under Napoleon Bonaparte, new laws were created for the colonies to replace the previous universal laws that applied to both France and the colonies. Bonaparte rejected assimilation and declared that the colonies would be governed under separate laws. He believed that if universal laws continued, the residents of the colonies would eventually have the power to control the local governments, which would have an adverse effect on "cheap slave labour". He meanwhile reinstated slavery in the Caribbean possessions.

Even with Bonaparte's rejection of assimilation, many still believed it to be a good practice. On July 24, 1833, a law was passed to give all free colony residents "civil and political rights". Also, the Revolution in 1848 restored "assimilation theory" was restored, with colonies again under universal rules.

There were many problems that emerged during colonisation, but those faced with the dilemmas thought assimilation sounded simple and attainable and wanted to spread French culture. Claude Adrien Helvétius, a philosopher and supporter of assimilation, believed that education was essential to assimilation.

Senegal's Four Communes 

Examples of assimilation in practice in the colonies were in Senegal's Four Communes: Gorée, Dakar, Rufisque and Saint-Louis. The purpose of the theory of assimilation was to turn African natives into Frenchmen by educating them in the language and culture and making them equal French citizens. During the French Revolution of 1848, slavery was abolished, and the Four Communes were given voting rights and granted the right to elect a Deputy to the National Assembly in Paris. In the 1880s, France expanded its rule to other colonies. There was opposition from the French locals and so the universal laws did not apply to the new colonies.

The residents of the Four Communes were referred as "originaires" and had been exposed to assimilation for so long that they had become a "typical French citizen... he was expected to be everything except in the color of his skin, a Frenchman."  They were African elite". One of them was Blaise Diagne, who was the first black deputy in the French National assembly. He "defended the status of the originaires as French citizens".  During his time as deputy, he proposed a resolution that would allow the residents of the Four Communes all the rights of French citizens, which included being able to serve in the army. That was especially important during World War I, and the resolution passed on October 19, 1915. The Four Communes remained the only French colony whose indigènes received French citizenship until 1944.

See also
Francization
Évolués
Affranchis
Assimilados
Ilustrados
Emancipados
Black Ladinos
Chinese

References 

Raymond F Betts ASSIMILATION AND ASSOCIATION IN FRENCH COLONIAL TERRITORY 1890 TO 1915. (First ed. 1961), Reprinted University of Nebraska Press, 2005. .
Erik Bleich. The legacies of history? Colonization and immigrant integration in Britain and France. Theory and Society, Volume 34, Number 2, April 2005.
Michael Crowder. Senegal: A Study in French Assimilation Policy.  London: Oxford University Press, 1962.
Mamadou Diouf. The French Colonial Policy of Assimilation and the Civility of the Originaires of the Four Communes (Senegal): A Nineteenth Century Globalization Project. Development and Change,  Volume 29, Number 4, October 1998, pp. 671–696(26)
M. M. Knight. French Colonial Policy—the Decline of "Association". The Journal of Modern History, Vol. 5, No. 2 (Jun., 1933), pp. 208–224
Martin D Lewis  ONE HUNDRED MILLION FRENCHMEN:THE "ASSIMILATION" THEORY IN FRENCH COLONIAL POLICY Comparative Studies in Society and History, Vol. 4, No. 2. (Jan., 1962), pp. 129–153.
Michael Lambert FROM CITIZENSHIP TO NÉGRITUDE: MAKING A DIFFERENCE IN ELITE IDEOLOGIES OF COLONIZED FRANCOPHONE WEST AFRICA Comparative Studies in Society and History, Vol. 35, No. 2. (Apr., 1993), pp. 239–262.

French West Africa
History of Senegal
French colonisation in Africa